The women's points race competition at the 2022 UEC European Track Championships was held on 14 August 2022.

Results
125 laps (25 km) will be raced with 12 sprints.

References

Women's points race
European Track Championships – Women's points race